Heinz Kinigadner (born 28 January 1960) is an Austrian former professional motocross racer. He competed in the Motocross World Championships from 1978 to 1988. Kinigadner is notable for being the first Austrian competitor to win an FIM motocross world championship. He won consecutive 250cc motocross world championships in 1984 and 1985. After his motocross career, he became a successful Rally Raid competitor. In 2016, Kinigadner was named an FIM Legend for his motorcycle racing achievements.

Biography
Born in Uderns, Tyrol, Kinigadner was the FIM 250cc motocross world champion in 1984 and 1985 while riding for the KTM factory racing team.

In 1989, Kinigadner began competing in Rally raid races such as the Paris to Dakar rally and the Rallye des Pharaons. He took part in seven career Paris to Dakar races and won several stages but, was never able to complete a race due to mechanical breakdowns or injuries. During his rally racing career he claimed victories in the Rallye des Pharaons (1994), the Paris-Peking Rally, the Dubai Rally (1995, 1996, 1998) and the Brazil Rally (1998). He retired in 2000 after suffering a thigh fracture. After his racing career, he became a Sporting Director for KTM.

After his older brother and son were paralyzed in accidents, Kinigadner helped start the Wings for Life foundation together with Dietrich Mateschitz, which is dedicated to finding a cure for spinal cord injuries. Being the first Austrian motocross world champion racing on an Austrian-made KTM motorcycle coupled with his rally racing exploits boosted his popularity in his native Austria.

References

External links 
 Heinz Kinigadner home page 

1960 births
Living people
People from Schwaz District
Austrian motocross riders
Enduro riders
Dakar Rally motorcyclists
Off-road racing drivers
Off-road motorcycle racers
Sportspeople from Tyrol (state)